Librizzi (Sicilian: Libbrizzi) is a comune (municipality) in the Metropolitan City of Messina in the Italian region Sicily, located about  east of Palermo and about  west of Messina, on a hill between the Timeto and Librizzi streams.

Its origins date most likely to the 12th century, when a community rose around the Brichinnai castle.

References

Cities and towns in Sicily